The Heritage Exhibition of a Traditional Pawnshop Business is a museum in Sé, Macau, China.

History
The building was originally established in 1917 as the Virtue and Success Pawnshop (Tak Seng On Pawnshop) by Kou Ho Neng and Wong Hung Shan. The shop was closed in 1993 due to the decline in pawnshop business. In 2000, the Secretariat for Social Affairs and Culture restored the shop building to its original design. It was then opened to the public on 21 March 2003. The building received an Honorable Mention in the UNESCO 2004 Asia-Pacific Awards for the Conservation of Cultural Heritage and was selected as an Urban Best Practices Area by Shanghai World Expo 2010.

Architecture
The building consists of two blocks, which are the front block of a three-story pawnshop and a bank and the rear block of a seven-story storehouse.

See also
 List of museums in Macau

References

2003 establishments in Macau
Museums established in 2003
Museums in Macau
Sé, Macau